"Chosen One" is a song by Swedish band The Concretes from their second album, In Colour. It was released as the lead single from that album in 2006.

Track listings

Scandinavian release
CD LFS019
"Chosen One" - 3:08
"Reverberation" - 2:54
"Postpone It" - 3:46

UK release
7" LF019
"Chosen One" - 3:08
"Reverberation" - 2:54
7" LFX019
"Chosen One" (demo version)
"Postpone It" - 3:46
CD LFCD019
"Chosen One" - 3:08
"Reverberation" - 2:54
"Postpone It" - 3:46
"Chosen One" (video)

Charts

References

2006 singles
2006 songs